Arkyt is a village in Jalal-Abad Region of Kyrgyzstan, located south of Lake Sary-Chelek and north of Kerben. It is part of the Aksy District. It is the headquarters of the Sary-Chelek Nature Reserve. Its population was 1,379 in 2021.

References

Populated places in Jalal-Abad Region